The Ministry of Finance of Suriname is a government agency charged with the fiscal and financial implementation of government policies.

The duties of the ministry were determined by the National Assembly of Suriname in 1991 and then made some adjustments. Some of the areas of responsibility are financial and monetary policy, insurance, government bonds, treasury bills, management and supervision of state funds, national lotteries, postal services, import duties, excise duties and the central national accounting service.

Ministers
Willem Smit, 1948
J. C. Zaal, 1949
Jacques Drielsma, 1949-1950
Archibald Currie, 1950-1951
Jacques Drielsma, 1951-1952
Jan Buiskool, 1952
Julius Curiël, 1952
Severinus Desiré Emanuels, 1952-1955
Willem Smit, 1955-1958
Jules Sedney, 1958-1963
Johan Adolf Pengel, 1963-1969
Edgar Wijngaarde, 1969
Harry Radhakishun, 1969-1973
Henck Arron, 1973-1977
Lesley Goede, 1977-1980
Henry Neijhorst, 1980
Marcel Chehin, 1980
Henk Chin A Sen, 1980
André Telting, 1980-1982
Henry Neijhorst, 1982
Winston Caldeira, 1983-1984
Marcel Chehin, 1984
Normann Kleine, 1985
Wim Udenhout, 1985-1986
Subhas Mungra, 1986-1990
Jules Wijdenbosch, 1991
Eddy Sedoc, 1991
Rudi Roseval, 1991
Eddy Sedoc, 1991-1992
Humphrey Hildenberg, 1992-1996
M. Atta Mungra, 1996-1997
Tjandrikapersad Gobardhan, 1997-1999
Errol Alibux, 1999-2000
Humphrey Hildenberg, 2000-2010
Wonnie Boedhoe, 2010-2011
Adelien Wijnerman, 2011-2014
Andy Rusland, 2014-2015
Gillmore Hoefdraad, 2015-2020
Armand Achaibersing, 2020–2022
Albert Ramdin, acting 2022-

See also
Economy of Suriname

References 

Finance
Suriname
Economy of Suriname